69 electorate members of the New Zealand House of Representatives were to be elected in the general election on 27 July 2002. The tables below show the candidates for each electorate. Incumbent electorate MPs are highlighted in blue, and those candidates who were members of the previous parliament via their party list—regardless of which electorate they previously contested—are highlighted in red.

Where candidates were listed on their party's list, this is shown accordingly. There are a number of cases why candidates don't have a list ranking:
Some candidates belong to a registered party, but they were not on their party's list – this is shown on "none".
Some candidates belong to a registered party, but the party did not submit a party list – the list field is blank in this case.
Some candidates belong to an unregistered party, and those cannot submit a party list – the list field is blank in this case.

At the 2002 general election Libertarianz was the only registered party that did not submit a list.

General electorates

Aoraki

|}

Auckland Central

|}

Banks Peninsula

|}

Bay of Plenty

|}

Christchurch Central

|}

Christchurch East

|}

Clevedon

|-
!colspan=6| Retiring incumbents and withdrawn candidates
|-

|}

Clutha-Southland

|}

Coromandel

|}

Dunedin North

|}

Dunedin South

|}

East Coast

|}

East Coast Bays

|}

Epsom

|}

Hamilton East

|}

Hamilton West

|}

Helensville

|}

Hutt South

|}

Ilam

|}

Invercargill

|}

Kaikoura

|}

Mana

|-
!colspan=6| Retiring incumbents and withdrawn candidates
|-

|}

Māngere

|}

Manukau East

|}

Manurewa

|}

Maungakiekie

|}

Mount Albert

|}

Mount Roskill

|}

Napier

|-
!colspan=6| Retiring incumbents and withdrawn candidates
|-

|}

Nelson

|}

New Lynn

|}

New Plymouth

|}

North Shore

|}

Northcote

|}

Northland

|}

Ohariu-Belmont

|}

Otago

|}

Otaki 

|-
!colspan=6| Retiring incumbents and withdrawn candidates
|-

|}

Pakuranga 

|}

Palmerston North 

|}

Piako

|}

Port Waikato 

|}

Rakaia 

|-
!colspan=6| Retiring incumbents and withdrawn candidates
|-

|}

Rangitikei 

|}

Rimutaka 

|}

Rodney 

|}

Rongotai 

|}

Rotorua

|}

Tamaki 

|}

Taranaki-King Country

|}

Taupo

|}

Tauranga 

|}

Te Atatu 

|}

Tukituki 

|}

Waimakariri 

|}

Wairarapa

|}

Waitakere 

|}

Wellington Central 

|}

West Coast-Tasman 

|}

Whanganui 

|}

Whangarei 

|}

Wigram 

|}

Māori electorates

Ikaroa-Rāwhiti 

|}

Tainui

|}

Tamaki Makaurau

|}

Te Tai Hauāuru

|}

Te Tai Tokerau

|}

Te Tai Tonga 

|}

Waiariki

|}

References

2002 New Zealand general election
Candidates 2002